Callitris columellaris is a species of coniferous tree in the family Cupressaceae (cypress family), native to most of Australia. Common names include white cypress, white cypress-pine, Murray River cypress-pine, and northern cypress-pine. Callitris columellaris has become naturalised in Hawaii and in southern Florida.

Description
It is a small evergreen tree, 4–12 m (rarely to 20 m) high, with a trunk up to 50 cm diameter. The leaves are scale-like, 2–6 mm long and 0.5 mm broad, arranged in decussate whorls of three on very slender shoots 0.7–1 mm diameter. The cones are globose, 1–2 cm diameter, with six triangular scales, which open at maturity to release the seeds.

Taxonomy
Some authors (e.g. Thompson & Johnson 1986, followed by the Flora of Australia Online) divide it into three species (or occasionally as varieties), based largely on the foliage colour, with green plants predominating on the east coast of Australia, and glaucous plants in the interior, and on cone size, with on average marginally smaller cones in tropical areas (north of 22°S). However, others (e.g. Blake 1959, Farjon 2005) point out that both the foliage colour and cone size is very variable, even from tree to tree in local populations, and maintain that it is impossible to distinguish three taxa within the species. When split into three species, the following names apply:
Callitris columellaris F.Muell. sensu stricto – coastal northeast New South Wales, southeast Queensland.
Callitris glaucophylla Joy Thomps. & L.A.S.Johnson (syn. C. columellaris var. campestris Silba; C. glauca nom. inval.; C. hugelii nom. inval.) – throughout most of the southern half of Australia.
Callitris intratropica R.T.Baker & H.G.Smith (syn. C. columellaris var. intratropica Silba) – northern Queensland, northern Northern Territory, northern Western Australia.

Pollination
Eric Rolls described the pollination of C.columellaris thus: "At pollination time when hundreds of cones go off together
with a sharp crack and spurt brown pollen a metre into the air, the whole
tree shivers."

Gallery

References

External links

 Blake, S. T. (1959). New or noteworthy plants, chiefly from Queensland. Proc. Roy. Soc. Queensland 70 (6): 33–46.
 Farjon, A. (2005). Monograph of Cupressaceae and Sciadopitys, pp. 507–513. Royal Botanic Gardens, Kew. .
 Thompson, J. & Johnson, L. A. S. (1986). Callitris glaucophylla, Australia's 'White Cypress Pine' – a new name for an old species. Telopea'' 2 (6): 731–736.
 
 
 
 
 
 Gymnosperm Database - Callitris columellaris
 Gymnosperm Database - Callitris glaucophylla
 Gymnosperm Database - Callitris intratropica

columellaris
Pinales of Australia
Trees of Australia
Trees of Mediterranean climate
Flora of Western Australia
Flora of Queensland
Flora of New South Wales
Drought-tolerant trees
Least concern flora of Australia
Least concern biota of Queensland
Taxa named by Ferdinand von Mueller